"Eighteen Wheels and a Dozen Roses" is a song written by Paul Nelson and Gene Nelson, and recorded by American country music artist Kathy Mattea.  It was released in March 1988 as the second single from her album Untasted Honey.  The song hit number one on both the US and Canadian Country charts in 1988.

Content
The song is about a truck driver named Charlie who is retiring after thirty years to spend more time with his wife. The song mentions Charlie receiving a gold watch, a common retirement gift. The song's chorus counts down from the number 18 (the number of wheels) to 12 (the roses), until Charlie eventually reaches the "one that he loves."

Music video
The video was directed by May/Sams. The video opens with Mattea dining at the Pie Wagon, a diner off Music Row in Nashville, when a truck driver approaches her and asks for her autograph as a present for his wife. Here, we learn that her first name is Nina. Throughout the video, there are scenes of Mattea on her tour bus, performing with her band, and scenes of the truck driver. In the end, the driver makes it home, his wife greeting him, and he hands her the dozen roses mentioned in the song's lyric, as they walk arm in arm into their house;  Kathy turns off the lights to the bus, and the video ends with a shot of various trucks driving on the highway.

Charts

Weekly charts

Year-end charts

External links
Lyrics at cmt.com

References

1988 singles
1987 songs
Kathy Mattea songs
Songs written by Paul Nelson (songwriter)
Song recordings produced by Allen Reynolds
Mercury Records singles
Songs written by Gene Nelson (songwriter)
Songs about truck driving